The Great German Synagogue is one of five synagogues in the Jewish Ghetto of Venice, Italy. Established in 1528, it is the oldest Venetian synagogue.

The synagogue was most recently restored between 2016 and 2017 by the World Monuments Fund. No longer used for regular worship, it is open to the public through the Jewish Museum of Venice.

History
The Great German Synagogue is one of the three synagogues located in the Ghetto Nuovo (the oldest part of the Venetian Ghetto, established on 29 March 1516), together with the Scuola Canton and Scuola Italiana. It was built in 1528 by members of the local Ashkenazi community. A stone plaque on the west wall of the building records its construction at the expense of two donors. Like the other four synagogues in Venice, it was termed a scuola ("School"), rather than sinagoga ("Synagogue"), in the same way in which Ashkenazi Jews refer to the synagogue as the shul in Yiddish.

The Great German Synagogue was the first public synagogue erected in the Ghetto Nuovo. Together with the nearby Scuola Canton, completed in 1532, it stands as a testament to the influence of the Ashkenazi community in the early years of the Ghetto, before the arrival of the much more affluent Jewish merchants from Spain and the Levant in the 1550s.

Along with the other synagogues of Venice, it ceased to be regularly used in October 1917, when the local Jewish community was forced to disband; at the same time, administration of all the Jewish places of worship was taken over by a single institution, the Templi Israelitici Uniti.

Architecture
Built on top of a preexisting structure, the prayer hall features an irregular shape. The bimah was originally placed in the middle of the room in accordance with the traditional "central bimah" configuration, and only later moved to the north end of the sanctuary.

Gallery

Notes

References

Cited literature

Orthodox synagogues in Italy
Jews and Judaism in Venice
Ashkenazi Jewish culture in Italy
Ashkenazi synagogues
16th-century synagogues
1520s establishments in the Republic of Venice
Synagogues in Venice
Religious buildings and structures completed in 1528
German diaspora in Europe
German-Jewish diaspora